The America Zone was one of the three regional zones of the 1958 Davis Cup.

7 teams entered the America Zone, with the winner going on to compete in the Inter-Zonal Zone against the winners of the Eastern Zone and Europe Zone. The United States defeated Argentina in the final and progressed to the Inter-Zonal Zone.

Draw

Quarterfinals

Argentina vs. Caribbean/West Indies

Canada vs. Cuba

Venezuela vs. United States

Semifinals

Argentina vs. Israel

Canada vs. United States

Final

United States vs. Argentina

References

External links
Davis Cup official website

Davis Cup Americas Zone
America Zone
Davis Cup